Carcinoembryonic antigen-related cell adhesion molecule 8 (CEACAM8) also known as CD66b (Cluster of Differentiation 66b), is a member of the carcinoembryonic antigen (CEA) gene family. Its main function is cell adhesion, cell migration, and pathogen binding.

Use
CEACAM8 is expressed exclusively on granulocytes and used as granulocyte marker.

See also
 Cluster of differentiation

References

Further reading

External links
 
 
 PDBe-KB provides an overview of all the structure information available in the PDB for Human Carcinoembryonic antigen-related cell adhesion molecule 8 (CEACAM8)

Clusters of differentiation